Frenchman's Tower is a two-story red brick structure located in Santa Clara County, California, that resembles a medieval fortification. Built in 1875, the structure was listed as a California Point of Historical Interest in 1969.

The structure was built under the direction of land owner Paulin Caperon, a native of France who had assumed the name Peter Coutts when he moved to Mayfield, California, in 1875. Coutts returned to France in 1882 without letting his California neighbors know what happened to him and ordered a bank to liquidate his Mayfield property.

Since then trespassers have carved names or initials into almost every brick of the tower within their reach. Some dates go back over 100 years. In 1970, the landowner bricked in the windows to protect the structure from vandals. Frenchman's Tower stands on Old Page Mill Road, midway between Foothill Expressway and Interstate 280, in Santa Clara County, California, within a strip of land within the borders of Palo Alto on land now owned by  Stanford University.

Architecture 

Frenchman's Tower was built in 1875 and has miniature crenels along the top and Gothic windows,
giving it a style similar to Medieval fortifications built hundreds of years earlier, not unlike Chindia Tower built between the 15th and 19th century.  In the Middle Ages, crenels were used to
shield archers defending the structure.

The second floor held a water tank, while the first floor was used as a library. The original owner, Paulin Caperon, spent many hours in his library reading and studying. The building never had any doors, requiring entry through a window

The tower, situated near Matadero Creek, was originally connected to one of six tunnels used to provide subterranean water to his farm and to his lake. Workers had to remove tons of earth before reaching a sufficient underground water source. Bricks for the tower were made by Albert Bowman and Company from a clay deposit discovered in Mountain View in the same year that the tower was constructed.

Public interest and notability 

Over the years, many different ideas and stories regarding Paulin Caperon's tower and tunnels have been told. Caperon, who also went by the alias Peter Coutts, is said to have "enjoyed mystifying his neighbors" and often helped perpetuate these stories by neither denying nor confirming the fanciful tales. These include the construction of tunnels and a fortified tower to "withstand a siege by his enemies" and harboring the French Empress, neither of which were true.

Recognition 

Registered as California Point of Historical Interest November 3, 1969.
Listed on the Santa Clara County Heritage Resource Inventory.
The Library of Congress archives contain photos of Frenchman's Tower taken during August and September 1975.
A 1910-1930 photo shown on the right is in the San Jose Public Library.

Popular news media 
Popular news media of today sometimes casts the tower as an unsolved mystery.

In a March 2011, CBS news reporter Ken Bastida interviewed local historian Steve Staiger. Staiger said he did not believe the structure was constructed as a water tower as the builder alleged because the tower was too far away from water or the rest of his property. Staiger offers a reward to anyone who solves the mystery. The TV report shows an entry-hole vandals chopped through the bricks on the back side of the tower.

Historical articles 
Peninsula Life Magazine published a 1948 article describing how Frenchman's Tower "standing stark and alone" on the banks of Matadero Creek is one of the Peninsula's most famous landmarks. The article goes on to tell the story of Paulin Caperon through interviews with family members.
The California Historical Society began a 1954 article with the sentence, "No tale in California history has had stranger diversities than the one about the man who sold to Leland Stanford the land on which he built his university."  The article continues with information based upon interviews with surviving members of Coutts's family and household, explaining the reason for Peter Coutts's strange behavior.
Although not referencing sources, the Stanford Historical Society published a 1981 article, "Coutts was no eccentric, history study shows", detailing the life of Paulin Caperon. The article provides explanations for many of his seemingly strange actions.

Public curiosity 

Some articles show the writer's curiosity about the tower.

 In a 2010 article, Examiner reporter William Baeck described how he climbed over a wire fence and crawled past poison oak. Then he held his camera inside the tower and began photographing.
In 2006 photographer Eric Chan took photos of the tower, including photos documenting his presence both outside and inside the tower.  He described how he climbed through a small hole in the back and found it "pretty scary inside". The photo on the right, showing the inside of the structure, is one of many he posted on Flickr.

Official concerns 

A 2004 environmental impact report on trail alignment expressed concerns that proposed trail segment AD05 would attract more visitors, possibly leading to the tower being further vandalized. The report also stated that more bike and foot traffic might make the tower more visible, possibly protecting the tower. To mitigate the risk, the landowner agreed to inspect the tower every six months and to take action upon discovery of further damage.

Paulin Caperon 
Jean-Baptiste Paulin Caperon was born of wealthy parents near Bordeaux France in 1822 and died in Bordeaux, France, in September 1889 at the age of
sixty-seven.

Paulin Caperon was the son of one of Napoleon's officers. He lost both parents when he was only 26 years old. He "openly criticized Napoleon III policies and opposed the Franco-Prussian War." He founded a private bank, which he sold in 1873. Because of problems in France, he left France for Brussels, Belgium,
and then went to New Orleans using identity papers of his deceased cousin Peter Coutts. He traveled to San Francisco and then to the township of Mayfield. Paulin Caperon continued using the name Peter Coutts when he arrived in Mayfield (present day Palo Alto).

In 1875 he bought 1,400 acres (4.7 km2) of Rancho Rincon de San Francisquito from Jeremiah Clarke for $90,000. Caperon had a heart ailment, and his wife was an invalid. He felt concerned that he and his wife might both die, and his children might have difficulty inheriting his estate, so he took title to the land in the name of his children's
governess Eugene Cloyensen.

Caperon developed the land into a thriving stock farm
and eventually directed the construction of a tower to distribute water.
He seemed friendly but would not discuss his past.
When local residents discovered that Peter Coutts (Paulin Caperon) had actually purchased the land in the name of his children's governess,
the townspeople grew suspicious,
made speculations, and spread rumors about the intended purpose of the
tower.  
In 1882, only eight years after his arrival, Paulin Caperon suddenly
returned to his native France
and sold the land
for the sum of $140,000 to Leland Stanford, who founded Stanford University in 1891.

Paulin Caperon eventually reacquired legal title to valuable property
he had owned in France. "Using his true identity, Caperon and his family returned to Paris in May 1883,"
and he spent the rest of his life in France.

See also
Palo Alto, California
Leland Stanford
Battlement
Rancho Rincon de San Francisquito
Franco-Prussian War

References

Further reading 
The Legend of Frenchman's Tower a 1951 article from the Union Democrat by Evalyn Slack Gist.
Guide to the Peter Coutts Collection at Stanford University Libraries, California 94304-6064, includes paper letters from Caperon's granddaughter.
Unpublished papers including : Geoffrey Bilson, "Peter Coutts - 'The Frenchman'"

External links 

Photos at Palo Alto Historical Society
Elizabeth Traugott's interview with Steve Staiger's in 1997 Palo Alto Online article
The best of Santa Clara Valley 1997 at Metroactive.
The mysterious Peter Coutts in a 1998 Palo Alto Online article
A panorama of graffiti painted on the inside of the tower.
An Enduring Heritage: Historic Buildings of the San Francisco Peninsula By Dorothy F. Regnery, Page 72

History of Santa Clara County, California
Buildings and structures in Palo Alto, California
Stanford University places
Tourist attractions in Santa Clara County, California
Rancho Rincon de San Francisquito
Towers completed in 1895
1895 establishments in California